("Our Arunachal"), is a song written by Bhupen Hazarika which appeared in the 1977 film "Mera Dharam Meri Maa" and has become a de facto state song for Arunachal Pradesh, India.

Lyrics

See also
List of Indian state songs
Emblem of Arunachal Pradesh

References

External links
Arunachal Hamara - Original 1977 recording
Arunachal Hamara - 2022 Team Arunachal Idol recording

Indian state songs
Symbols of Arunachal Pradesh